Kismet were an Australian darkwave band, formed in 1993 by Macedonian immigrant and ex-Mizar guitarist Gorazd Chapovski after that band's breakup in 1991 and his relocation to Australia shortly after.

History 
Kismet were formed in 1993 by Chapovski. His Mizar bandmate Ilija Stojanovski joined him on bass.

The group released their first EP, Dormant Dire, in 1994, followed by a full-length, Damjan's War, in 1995. In 1997, they signed to the Tone Casualties label in the US, releasing an album, Wake Up Gods shortly after. In 1999, the group released the North Atlantic Balkan Express album, which had used working titles "The Tank" and "Black General". That year, they moved back to Macedonia, contributing two tracks to a tribute album to Mizar and coordinating the project. They got a Macedonian record deal with Avalon Produkcija, releasing the Dreaming LP in 2002.

The band broke up that year and Chapovski reconvened Mizar.

External links 
 Official website (last updated in 2000)
 Kismet at Discogs

Macedonian dark wave musical groups
Musical groups established in 1993
Musical groups disestablished in 2002